Blacknest is a village and civil parish in Hampshire, England. It is in the civil parish of Binsted.

The village has a golf course (the Blacknest Golf & Country Club), one pub (named the Jolly Farmer), and access to the Alice Holt Forest. Its nearest town is Alton, which lies approximately 5 miles (8 km) west from the village.

Villages in Hampshire